The Deori Autonomous Council (DAC) is an autonomous district council in Lakhimpur district in the state of Assam in India.

History
The Deori Autonomous Council was founded in 2005 following an agreement between the Government of Assam and representatives of the Deori people who wanted greater autonomy for the area. The first election for the council were held in 2007.

Structure

Deori Autonomous Council

Earlier, the Deori Autonomous Council had 20 members of which 18 are elected by the first past the post system and 2 were nominated by the Government of Assam. Of the elected seats, nine were reserved for members of scheduled tribes and three for women.

The Deori Autonomous Council (Amendment) Bill, 2021 increased the number of seats to 26, out of which 22 seats will be directly elected and 4 seats will be nominated by the Government. Out of 22 elected seats, 18 seats will be reserved for Scheduled Tribes, 3 seats will be reserved for women and 1 seat will be reserved for general category.

Village councils

Each village in the area elects a village council of 10 members of which at least five must be from the Deori community and at least one a woman. Each village council is led by a president.

See also 
 Deori people

References

External links 
 Deori Autonomous Council

Autonomous regions of India
States and territories established in 2005
2005 establishments in Assam